Paranoia is a 1967 Dutch drama film directed by Adriaan Ditvoorst. It was entered into the 17th Berlin International Film Festival.

Cast
 Kees van Eyck - Arnold Cleever
 Pamela Koevoets - Anna (as Pamela Rose)
 Rudolf Lucieer - Reclametekenaar
 Paul Murk - Cleevers oom
 Mimi Kok - Zijn maîtresse
 Ab van Ieperen
 Ton Vos - Anna's vader
 Rob du Mee - Priester
 Max Kok
 Helene Kamphuis
 Ko Roblin
 Jan ter Oever

References

External links

1967 films
1960s Dutch-language films
1967 drama films
Dutch black-and-white films
Films directed by Adriaan Ditvoorst
Dutch drama films